Ralph Bryans (7 March 1941 – 6 August 2014) was a Grand Prix motorcycle road racer from Northern Ireland. Bryans was Ireland's only Grand Prix world champion, winning the 50 cc title in 1965.

Racing career
Bryans started road-riding on a BSA Bantam when working as a sixteen-year-old apprentice fitter. He entered his first race, the 1959 Tandragee 100, on a borrowed Ambassador 199 cc. For the 1960 season, he fitted a Triumph Terrier 150 cc engine to his Bantam frame, winning the 1960 Irish 200 cc Championship.

For the 1961 season Bryans then progressed to a 1958 350 cc Manx Norton provided by sponsor James Wilson, an insurance broker, further-learning his skills in company of established racers Tommy Robb, Dick Creith and George Purvis. In 1962, Bryans first entered the Isle of Man TT and later in the Ulster Grand Prix was placed ninth in 350 cc class riding his Wilson-Norton and tenth in the 500 cc class on a Reg Dearden Manx Norton.

In December 1962, Bryans arranged to ride Joe Ryan Nortons during 1963, when he was first noticed by Jim Redman at the Ulster Grand Prix. Bultaco signed Bryans after 'guest riding' their machines in Spain, but allowed Bryans to take advantage of a later offer from Honda to ride works machines in 1964, during which he was placed second in the 50 cc class and third in the 125 cc TT races. In 1965, Bryans won three races along with two second-place finishes to win the 50cc world championship for the Honda factory racing team.

After a short illness Bryans died at his home in Scotland at age 72 on 6 August 2014.

Motorcycle Grand Prix results

(key) (Races in italics indicate fastest lap)

References

British motorcycle racers
Motorcycle racers from Northern Ireland
500cc World Championship riders
350cc World Championship riders
250cc World Championship riders
125cc World Championship riders
50cc World Championship riders
Isle of Man TT riders
1941 births
2014 deaths
Sportspeople from Belfast